The arrondissement of Nogent-le-Rotrou is an arrondissement of France in the Eure-et-Loir department in the Centre-Val de Loire region. It has 48 communes.

Composition

The communes of the arrondissement of Nogent-le-Rotrou, and their INSEE codes, are:

 Arcisses (28236)
 Argenvilliers (28010)
 Les Autels-Villevillon (28016)
 Authon-du-Perche (28018)
 La Bazoche-Gouet (28027)
 Beaumont-les-Autels (28031)
 Belhomert-Guéhouville (28033)
 Béthonvilliers (28038)
 Champrond-en-Gâtine (28071)
 Champrond-en-Perchet (28072)
 Chapelle-Guillaume (28078)
 Chapelle-Royale (28079)
 Charbonnières (28080)
 Chassant (28086)
 Combres (28105)
 Les Corvées-les-Yys (28109)
 Coudray-au-Perche (28111)
 La Croix-du-Perche (28119)
 Les Étilleux (28144)
 Fontaine-Simon (28156)
 Frazé (28161)
 Friaize (28166)
 La Gaudaine (28175)
 Happonvilliers (28192)
 La Loupe (28214)
 Luigny (28219)
 Manou (28232)
 Marolles-les-Buis (28237)
 Meaucé (28240)
 Miermaigne (28252)
 Montigny-le-Chartif (28261)
 Montireau (28264)
 Montlandon (28265)
 Moulhard (28273)
 Nogent-le-Rotrou (28280)
 Nonvilliers-Grandhoux (28282)
 Saint-Bomer (28327)
 Saint-Éliph (28335)
 Saintigny (28331)
 Saint-Jean-Pierre-Fixte (28342)
 Saint-Maurice-Saint-Germain (28354)
 Saint-Victor-de-Buthon (28362)
 Souancé-au-Perche (28378)
 Le Thieulin (28385)
 Thiron-Gardais (28387)
 Trizay-Coutretot-Saint-Serge (28395)
 Vaupillon (28401)
 Vichères (28407)

History

The arrondissement of Nogent-le-Rotrou was created in 1800, disbanded in 1926 and restored in 1943.

As a result of the reorganisation of the cantons of France which came into effect in 2015, the borders of the cantons are no longer related to the borders of the arrondissements. The cantons of the arrondissement of Nogent-le-Rotrou were, as of January 2015:
 Authon-du-Perche
 La Loupe
 Nogent-le-Rotrou
 Thiron-Gardais

References

Nogent-le-Rotrou